Sandra Piršič (born October 25, 1984) is a Slovenian basketball player for Atomerőmű SE and the Slovenian national team.

She participated at the EuroBasket Women 2017.

References

1984 births
Living people
Slovenian women's basketball players
Sportspeople from Kranj
Centers (basketball)
Slovenian expatriate sportspeople in Hungary